Jamshid Shahmohammadi  is an Iranian football forward who played for Iran in the 1992 Asian Cup. He also played for Keshavarz F.C.

References

Iranian footballers
1968 births
Living people
Persepolis F.C. players
Keshavarz players
Saipa F.C. players
Esteghlal Ahvaz players
bahman players
Iran international footballers
1992 AFC Asian Cup players
Place of birth missing (living people)
Azadegan League players
Association football forwards
Footballers at the 1994 Asian Games
Asian Games competitors for Iran